Darbandi (also Romanized as Darbandī) is a village in Quchan Atiq Rural District, in the Central District of Quchan County, Razavi Khorasan Province, Iran. At the 2006 census, its population was 126, in 27 families.

References 

Populated places in Quchan County